Pelopidas jansonis  is a butterfly in the family Hesperiidae (Hesperiinae). It is endemic to Japan. The larva feeds on  Miseanthus (Graminea). There are  two broods. The larva of the second brood hibernates.

Etymology
The specific name honours Edward Wesley Janson.

References

Pelopidas (skipper)
Butterflies described in 1878
Butterflies of Japan
Taxa named by Arthur Gardiner Butler